Wakayama 3rd district is a constituency of the House of Representatives in the Diet of Japan (national legislature). It is located in Wakayama Prefecture and consists of Arida, Gobo, Shingu, and Tanabe cities and the Arida, Hidaka, Higashimuro, and Nishimuro districts. As of 2012, 298,296 eligible voters were registered in the district.

Since its creation in 1996, Wakayama 3rd district has been represented by Toshihiro Nikai for the New Frontier Party (NFP), the Conservative Party, the New Conservative Party and the Liberal Democratic Party (LDP). Nikai, a former Transport, Hokkaido and Economy minister, is a member of the LDP's Ibuki faction since his own faction of former Conservative Party members dissolved in 2009.

Kimiyoshi Tamaki, a longtime Wakayama prefectural representative, failed to unseat Nikai in the 2009 election that brought the Democratic Party a landslide win. He was safely elected in the Kinki proportional representation block where all Democratic party list candidates managed to secure a seat in the House.

Before the 1994 electoral reform, the area had been part of Wakayama 2nd district where three, later two representatives were elected by single non-transferable vote.

List of representatives

Election results

References 

Districts of the House of Representatives (Japan)